The 2000–01 Egyptian Premier League is the Forty-fourth season of the Egyptian Premier League since its establishment in 1948. It was only consisting  of one group of 14 teams. It started on September 15, 2000.

Teams

Al-Ahly  
El-Ittihad
El Mansoura SC 
Al-Masry
Al Mokawloon
El Qanah
El Koroum
Dina Farms
Ismaily
Ghazl Al-Mehalla
Maaden
Sohag Railways
Tersana
Zamalek SC

League table

Season statistics

Scoring
 Largest winning margin: 6 goals
 Tersana 0–6 Al-Ahly (22 October 2000)
 Highest scoring game: 7 goals
 Sohag Railways 3–4  Al-Ahly (28 April 2001)
 Most goals scored in a match by a single team: 6 goals
 Tersana 0–6 Al-Ahly (22 October 2000)
 Most goals scored in a match by a losing team: 3 goals
 Sohag Railways 3–4  Al-Ahly (28 April 2001)

Top scorers

Hat-tricks

References

0
1
2000–01 in African association football leagues